The 2022 Summit League baseball tournament took place from May 26 through 29, 2022. It initially was supposed to start on May 25, but the tournament was pushed back a day due to inclement weather in the area. The top four regular-season teams of the league's seven teams met in the double-elimination tournament held at J. L. Johnson Stadium on the campus of Oral Roberts University in Tulsa, Oklahoma. The winner of the tournament, Oral Roberts, earned the Summit League's automatic bid to the 2022 NCAA Division I baseball tournament.

Standings and seeding
The top four teams from the regular season will be seeded one through four based on conference winning percentage during the double round-robin regular season. The teams then play a double-elimination tournament.

Reference:
 St. Thomas, Northern Colorado, and Western Illinois did not participate in the tournament
 St. Thomas is not eligible for postseason play until 2026

Results

Reference:

All-Tournament Team
The following players were named to the all-tournament team:

References

Summit League Baseball Tournament
 
Summit League baseball tournament